The Red Detachment of Women is a 1970 Chinese filmed performance of the Chinese ballet of the same name (originally produced in 1964) – which itself was a version of director Xie Jin's original 1961 film. The style is called 'yangbanxi' (revolutionary model dramas.) It is one of eight approved revolutionary model dramas made during the Cultural Revolution. A Beijing Opera version was filmed by the August First Film Studio in 1972.

Plot summary 

In the 1930s, on Hainan Island, the heroine, Wu Qinghua, escapes from Nan Batian, an evil landlord, and becomes the leader of a women's militia, under the guidance of Hong Changqing, a Communist Party secretary.

Cast 
Xue Jinghua as Wu Qinghua
Liu Qingtang as Hong Changqing
Song Chen as Company Commander
Li Xinying as Xiao Pang, the Messenger
Li Chengxiang as Nan Batian, the Tyrant
Wan Qiwu as Ou Guangsi, Nan Batian's lackey

World Events

On 11 November 2012, in Washington, D.C., a panel discussion with Ambassador Chas W. Freeman, Dr,. Chi Wang, Dr. Carma Hinton, and Dr. Michael Chang discussed the effect of this film had on the Cultural Revolution and on Chinese film.

References

Sources

External links 

The Red Detachment of Women from the Chinese Movie Database

1970 films
Chinese drama films
1970s Mandarin-language films
1970s musical films
Chinese propaganda films
Maoist China propaganda films
Films set in Hainan